Cerceda is a municipality of northwestern Spain in the province of A Coruña, in the autonomous community of Galicia. It belongs to the comarca of Ordes. It has a population of 5,597 inhabitants (INE, 2008).

References

External links
Concello de Cerceda

Municipalities in the Province of A Coruña